Jack Mahon may refer to:
Jack Mahon (Gaelic footballer), Irish Gaelic footballer
Jack Mahon (footballer, born 1886), English football player
Jack Mahon (footballer, born 1911), English football player and manager

See also
John Mahon (disambiguation)